The 10th Anniversary Cup (Gvia HaAsor) was a stand-alone cup competition played to celebrate the 10th anniversary of the Israeli Declaration of Independence.

The competition was split to two, the top competition played by the 12 1957–58 Liga Leumit clubs, with 4 clubs from 1957–58 Liga Alef. The other 8 Liga Alef clubs, along with 8 1957–58 Liga Bet clubs took part in a minor cup tournament titled The FA Cup (Gvia HaHit’ahchadut). The two competitions were played as a knock-out tournament.

Gvia HaAsor

First round
All matches were played on 11 October 1958, with replays being played a week later.

Replays

Quarter-finals
All matches were played on 25 October 1958, with a replay being held on 29 October 1958.

Replay

Semi-finals
Both matches were played in neutral grounds on 1 November 1958.

Final

Gvia HaHit'achadut

First round
The draw for the first round was held on 1 October 1958. All matches were played on 11 October 1958.

Quarter-finals
Matches were played on 18 October 1958.

Semi-finals
Both matches were played in neutral grounds on 25 October 1958. The match between Hapoel Be'er Sheva and Hapoel Holon has ended in a draw after 90 minutes, and due to crowd troubles extra-time was not played. A replay was played on 8 November 1958 in Hadera behind closed doors, and a second replay in Jerusalem on 12 November 1958.

Replay

Second Replay

Final

Notes

References
100 Years of Football 1906-2006, Elisha Shohat (Israel), 2006

Anniversary Cup
Predecessors